Joshua Alexander (born September 28, 1987) is an American retired professional basketball player. He played college basketball at Stephen F. Austin.

College career
Alexander was named Southland Conference Freshman of the Year. As a junior, Alexander averaged 16.1 points and 5.8 rebounds per game. He was named Southland Player of the Year as well as First Team All-Southland. Alexander averaged 14.3 points and 5.5 rebounds per game as a senior. He helped the team reach their first NCAA Tournament in 2009. He finished his career with 1,074 points and 684 rebounds.

Professional career
In September 2009, Alexander signed his first professional contract with Polonia Warsaw of the Polish Basketball League. In December 2011, he signed with the Bakken Bears of the Danish league. He was named regular season and tournament MVP after leading the team to the championship. In 2013, Alexander joined Maccabi Beer Yaakov of the Israeli National League and averaged 20.2 points per game. For the 2013–14 season, he signed with A.S. Ramat HaSharon and averaged 19.7 points and 7.5 rebounds per game. In August 2014, Alexander signed with BC Orchies of the French  Nationale Masculine 1.

References

External links
SportsReference profile

1987 births
Living people
American expatriate basketball people in Denmark
American expatriate basketball people in France
American expatriate basketball people in Israel
American expatriate basketball people in Kosovo
American expatriate basketball people in Poland
American men's basketball players
Bakken Bears players
Basketball players from Shreveport, Louisiana
Hapoel Migdal HaEmek B.C. players
Small forwards
Stephen F. Austin Lumberjacks basketball players
Trefl Sopot players